Hāwera High School was a secondary school in the New Zealand town of Hāwera, which operated from 1901 until 2022.

History

The school's history began as a primary school in 1875, which was reformed as a district high school in 1901. In 1919, the school was again changed, this time as a technical school, with an opening roll of 180 students. The school moved from its original site in Princes Street to a new base in Camberwell Road two years later. The school had a roll of around 400 by the outbreak of World War II. The roll continued to grow in the post-war years, reaching a peak of over 1000 in the early 1970s. The current roll sits between 720 and 750 students.

In late 2021, it was announced that Hāwera High School and Hāwera Intermediate would close, and a new, Years 7–13, school would open in 2023. The new school was named Te Paepae o Aotea, a name gifted by local iwi Ngāti Ruanui and Ngāruahine.

Notable students

Aroha Awarau, playwright and journalist
Michael Bent (born 1986), Rugby Union Player, International Rugby Player for Ireland
Ian Clarke (1931–1997), All Black and rugby administrator
Enid Evans (1914–2011), chief librarian at the Auckland War Memorial Museum Library 
Issac Luke (born 1987), rugby league player
Ronald Hugh Morrieson (1922–1972), author
William Sheat (1899–1982), member of parliament
Hiwi Tauroa (1927–2018), rugby union player and Race Relations Conciliator
Lene Westgaard-Halle (1979– ), politician, member of the Norwegian Parliament
Adine Wilson (née Harper, born 1979), Silver Fern

References

Hāwera
Secondary schools in Taranaki